The 1941–42 Primeira Divisão was the eighth season of top-tier football in Portugal. At the beginning of the season, it was decided to expand the championship from 8 to 10 teams to admit Braga FA and Algarve FA champions (until this season only the top teams from Porto, Coimbra, Lisboa and Setúbal's FA were admitted). Porto finished the regional championship in third place, which did not grant entry into the Primeira Divisão. However, a Primeira Divisão second expand (from 10 to 12) in the same season was decided, which allowed the club to participate.

Overview

It was contested by 12 teams, and S.L. Benfica won the championship.

League standings

Results

References

Primeira Liga seasons
1941–42 in Portuguese football
Portugal